Edite Castro Soeiro (March 31, 1934 – July 27, 2009) was a Portuguese journalist, notable as one of the first women to attain a senior position on Portuguese journalism. She was born in Angola, where she worked for the Benguela weekly O Intransigente in the 1950s before moving to Portugal and working for the publications Flama, Notícia, O Jornal and Visão, amongst others.

In 2006 Soeiro received a Merit Award from the Portuguese Journalists' Association.

References

1934 births
2009 deaths